Carlos Daniel Hidalgo Cadena (born January 25, 1986) is a Colombian professional football (soccer) striker who plays for Deportivo Pasto.

He played on the Colombian U-17 team in the 2003 FIFA U-17 World Championship and ended up being one of the golden boot award winners by scoring 5 goals.

References

External links
 
 
 

1986 births
Living people
Sportspeople from Nariño Department
Colombian footballers
Colombian expatriate footballers
Colombia youth international footballers
Categoría Primera A players
Categoría Primera B players
Segunda División players
Paraguayan Primera División players
Bolivian Primera División players
Deportivo Pasto footballers
Deportes Quindío footballers
Independiente Santa Fe footballers
Sporting de Gijón players
Independiente Medellín footballers
Club Guaraní players
Atlético Bucaramanga footballers
Lobos BUAP footballers
Club Real Potosí players
C.D. Sonsonate footballers
Colombian expatriate sportspeople in Spain
Colombian expatriate sportspeople in Paraguay
Colombian expatriate sportspeople in Mexico
Colombian expatriate sportspeople in Bolivia
Colombian expatriate sportspeople in El Salvador
Expatriate footballers in Spain
Expatriate footballers in Paraguay
Expatriate footballers in Mexico
Expatriate footballers in Bolivia
Expatriate footballers in El Salvador
Association football forwards